Will Howard (born September 24, 2001) is an American football quarterback who currently plays for the Kansas State Wildcats.

Early life and high school
Howard grew up in Downingtown, Pennsylvania and attended Downingtown West High School. He was named the Maxwell Football Club Pennsylvania Player of the Year after passing for 2,543 yards and 27 touchdowns as a senior. Howard finished his high school career with 5,308 passing yards and 48 touchdown passes while also rushing for 512 yards and 21 touchdowns. He also was a two-time All-Area selection in basketball and scored over 1,000 points in his varsity career.

Howard was rated a three-star recruit and received over 20 total scholarship offers. He committed to play college football at Kansas State after considering offers from Maryland, Minnesota, Rutgers, and Kansas.

College career
Howard joined the Kansas State Wildcats as an early enrollee in January 2020. He began his freshman season as the backup to starting quarterback Skylar Thompson and started the final seven games after Thompson suffered a serious injury. Howard finished the season with 90 completions on 168 pass attempts for 1,178 yards with eight touchdowns and 10 interceptions and rushed for 364 yards and three touchdowns. He served as Thompson's backup again as a sophomore after competing for the starting job in practice. Howard played in six games with three starts.

As a junior, Howard began spring practice as the Wildcats first-string quarterback. Transfer Adrian Martinez was ultimately named the starter going into the 2022 and he initially intended to redshirt the season. Howard came in relief of Martinez after he suffered an injury against TCU and led the Wildcats on four straight touchdown drives and started the following game against Oklahoma State. Howard completed 19 of 27 passes for 196 yards and three touchdowns in relief of Martinez after he suffered another injury against Baylor. He became Kansas State's starting quarterback a second time after it was revealed Martinez's injury was serious.

College statistics

References

External links
Kansas State Wildcats profile

Living people
Players of American football from Pennsylvania
American football quarterbacks
Kansas State Wildcats football players
People from Downingtown, Pennsylvania
Sportspeople from Chester County, Pennsylvania
2001 births